The Slams is a 1973 American action film directed by Jonathan Kaplan and starring Jim Brown.

Plot
Curtis Hook (Jim Brown) is caught by the police after a heist. In jail, Curtis has to deal with people who want to know where he stashed the loot while also trying to get out of jail in time to get the money before its hiding place is demolished.

Cast
 Jim Brown as Curtis X. Hook
 Judy Pace as Iris Daniels
 Roland Bob Harris as Captain Stambell (as Roland 'Bob' Harris)
 Paul Harris as Jackson Barney (as Paul E. Harris)
 Frank DeKova as Capiello
 Ted Cassidy as Glover
 Frenchia Guizon as Macey
 John Dennis as Sergeant Morella / Flood 
 Jac Emel as Zack
 Quinn K. Redeker as The Warden (as Quinn Redeker)

Tagline
JIM BROWN goes over the wall to flash with a million $ stash.

Production
The film was produced by Gene Corman, brother of famous B-movie producer Roger Corman. Gene hired Kaplan on the basis of the director's handling of the black subplot in Roger Corman's The Student Teachers. The only requirement was that Kaplan meet with Jim Brown. "I found him to be quite sweet, quite charming," says Kaplan.

Kaplan found Gene Corman a far more hands on producer than his brother, casting the movie and using his own editor. The film was shot on location mostly at Lincoln Heights Prison in Los Angeles.

Brown wanted to fight someone bigger than him in a fight scene so Ted Cassidy was cast. Kaplan said he found the way to keep Brown engaged in the movie was to get him involved in some sort of competition, so he organised people to play chess with him in between takes.

"We got along because I treated him like an actor, not like an ex-football player," said Kaplan.

Reception
Dennis Schwartz gave it a C+ and said the film "Aims to prove that blacks like whites can also play amoral criminal hero roles with a straight face and a smirk."
Critic Mike McGranaghan gave it 3 out of 4 and wrote: "It's everything you could ever want from a Jim Brown prison movie."

References

External links
 

1973 films
Films directed by Jonathan Kaplan
1973 action films
Metro-Goldwyn-Mayer films
Films produced by Gene Corman
1970s English-language films
American action films
1970s American films